Couronne (French for "crown") was an emblematic ship of the French Navy built by order of Richelieu.

The Couronne was the first major warship to be designed and built by the French themselves in accordance with Richelieu's plans to renew the French Navy, after a series of warships had been built by the Dutch. The construction was supervised by Isaac de Launay Razilly (died in Arcadia 1635), and overseen by the famous carpenter Charles Morieu, from Dieppe. She was being constructed at La Roche-Bernard and was one of the most advanced units of her time. After launch in 1632 or 1633, she was moved to Brouage in September 1634 where she was completed around 1635 by Mathieu Casteau. She carried up to heavy guns, most on her two-deck broadsaide but also 8 firing forwards from the bow and 8 firing aft, an unusual feature until Dupuy de Lôme redesigned naval artillery.

Couronne took part in the Battle of Guetaria on 22 August 1638, and another expedition to Spain in 1639 under Henri de Sourdis.

The ship was disarmed in 1641 and broken up between 1643–1645.

See also 
Troupes de la marine
Troupes de Marine

References
Nomenclature des Vaisseaux de Louis XIII et de la régence d'Anne d'Autriche, 1610 a 1661. Alain Demerliac (Editions Omega, Nice – 2004).
The Sun King's Vessels (2015) - Jean-Claude Lemineur; English translation by François Fougerat. Editions ANCRE.  
Winfield, Rif and Roberts, Stephen (2017) French Warships in the Age of Sail 1626-1786: Design, Construction, Careers and Fates. Seaforth Publishing. .

External links

Ships of the line of the French Navy
Ships built in France
1630s ships